IET Smart Cities is a quarterly peer-reviewed scientific journal on urban engineering and sciences, more specifically on all aspects of smart cities. It was established in 2019 and is published by Wiley on behalf of the Institution of Engineering and Technology. The editors-in-chief are  William Webb (Webb Consulting) and  Chai K. Toh (Gerson Lehrman Group and National Tsing Hua University).

Abstracting and indexing
The journal is abstracted and indexed in:
Ei Compendex
Emerging Sources Citation Index
Inspec
Scopus

References

External links 

Engineering journals
Quarterly journals
English-language journals
Institution of Engineering and Technology academic journals
Publications established in 2019
Wiley (publisher) academic journals